The 2012 Open GDF Suez Nantes Atlantique was a professional tennis tournament played on indoor hard courts. It was the tenth edition of the tournament which was part of the 2012 ITF Women's Circuit. It took place in Nantes, France, on 29 October–4 November 2012.

WTA entrants

Seeds 

 1 Rankings are as of 22 October 2012.

Other entrants 
The following players received wildcards into the singles main draw:
  Séverine Beltrame
  Iryna Brémond
  Julie Coin

The following players received entry from the qualifying draw:
  Ons Jabeur
  Mervana Jugić-Salkić
  Magda Linette
  Olga Savchuk

The following player received entry by a Protected Ranking:
  Renata Voráčová

The following player received entry by a Junior Exempt:
  An-Sophie Mestach

The following player received entry as a Lucky loser:
  Myrtille Georges

Champions

Singles 

  Monica Niculescu def.  Yulia Putintseva 6–2, 6–3.

Doubles 

  Catalina Castaño /  Mervana Jugić-Salkić def.  Petra Cetkovská /  Renata Voráčová 6–4, 6–4.

External links 
 2012 Open GDF Suez Nantes Atlantique at ITFTennis.com
 

Open GDF Suez Nantes Atlantique
Open Nantes Atlantique